Olga Ikonnikova (born 14 May 1990 in Tallinn, Estonia) is an Estonian former competitive figure skater. She is the 2006 & 2008 Estonian national bronze medalist.

Competitive highlights

References

 

Estonian female single skaters
Living people
1990 births
Figure skaters from Tallinn
Estonian people of Russian descent